Kranji Station may refer to the following:
Kranji MRT station in Singapore
Kranji railway station in Bekasi, West Java